A urethropexy is a surgical procedure where support is provided to the urethra.

One form is the "Burch urethropexy".

It is sometimes performed in the treatment of incontinence (particularly stress incontinence).

References

Urologic surgery